Ulf Eriksson (born 1958) is a Swedish writer and literary critic.

He made his literary debut in 1982, with the poetry collection Varelser av gräs. Further books include the essay collection Rum för läsande from 1990, the poetry collection Rymdens vila (2002), the short story collection Beröring under oväder (2003), the novel Varelser av glas (2005), and the poetry collection Om dagars genomskinlighet (2006). He was awarded the Dobloug Prize in 1998, shared with Klas Östergren.

References

External links

1958 births
Living people
Swedish poets
Swedish novelists
Swedish short story writers
Dobloug Prize winners